Dahieh is a predominantly Shia Muslim suburb, located south of Beirut, in the Baabda District of Lebanon. It is composed of several towns and municipalities.

There is also a minority of coexisting Sunni Muslims, and a Palestinian refugee camp which has 20,000 inhabitants. It is located north of the Rafic Hariri International Airport, with the M51 Freeway that links Beirut to the Airport passing through it. Prior to the 2006 Lebanon War, Dahieh was a residential and commercial area with malls, stores and souks.

Dahieh is the Beirut stronghold of Shia militant group Hezbollah, and it had large auditoria in Haret Hreik, Hadath and Bourj el-Barajneh, where Hezbollah followers gathered during special occasions.

History
Bourj el-Barajneh is the oldest locality of Dahieh. The town was inhabited by Shias in 1367, when the inhabitants rose in rebellion against the Mamluks. The town was mentioned in the Ottoman tax register tapu tahrir of 1545, when it had a population of 169 households, 11 bachelors and one imam, all Shia Muslims. Shia of Bourj were also identified in al-Duwayhi's writings in 1661, and the town was then known as Burj Beirut (lit. "the tower of Beirut").
Prior the civil war, Dahieh was part of the increasingly urbanized rural settlements outside of Beirut, with both Christians and Shias. Apart from the local Shias, significant numbers of Shias from Southern Lebanon and Beqaa Valley had settled in Dahieh between 1920 and 1943, escaping financial hardship and the French mandate crackdown on Shiite rebels in June 1920. During the early 1960–70s, more Shiites arrived in Beirut and were concentrated in the southern and eastern suburbs, which became known as the povery belt.

Between 1975 and mid-1980s population increased as more Shias arrived from the East Beirut canton, Beqaa valley, and Southern Lebanon. Around 100,000 Shias were displaced from East Beirut canton in December 1975–1976 following the unfortunate events of Black Saturday, the Karantina massacre, and the siege of Naba'a/Tel al-Zaatar in East Beirut, and most re-settled in Dahieh. These included Mohammad Hussein Fadlallah and other religious scholars. Most of the displaced were destitute, and their needs stimulated Shia solidarity and self-reliance, which focused on the urban insularity of Dahieh. 
More Shiites arrived in Dahieh following the 1978 South Lebanon conflict and 1982 Israeli invasion of Lebanon, both of which caused more than 250,000 refugees and the destruction of eighty percent of the villages. Refusing to live under the Israeli South Lebanon Security Belt, more Shiites moved out of their villages to Beirut. By 1986, an estimated 800,000 Shias were living in Dahieh, the vast majority of Shia in Lebanon.

Demographics 

Dahieh is home to one of the most densely populated communities in Lebanon. In 1986 the number of Shia living in Dahieh was estimated to be 800,000.

2006 Lebanon war

Hezbollah's television station, Al-Manar, was targeted in the area.

Hours after the August 14, 2006 ceasefire, Hezbollah pledged to reconstruct houses for the dwellers of Dahieh, and offered rent money for the time-being as an attempt to build better houses condenses.

On September 22, 2006, Hezbollah's leader Hassan Nasrallah attended a mass rally in Dahieh declaring a "Divine Victory" against Israel. Apart from mentioning Hezbollah having 20,000 rockets at its disposal, he also went on to criticize Lebanon's central government, stating it should step down and form a unity government.

According to the Hezbollah's "Jihad al-Bina' " association, the reconstruction of Dahieh should begin from 25 May 2007, the day of the anniversary of the 2000 Israeli pullout from Lebanon.

2013 bombings 

On July 9, 2013, 53 people were wounded after a bomb exploded in a busy shopping street in the suburb; the blast came on a busy shopping day on the eve of the holy Muslim month of Ramadan. A faction of the Free Syrian Army (FSA) claimed responsibility; however, FSA spokesman Luay Miqdad condemned the attack, as well as another attack the following month.

On August 15, 2013, a month after the first bomb, another car bomb blast hit the suburb. At least 21 people were killed and 200 injured in the massive explosion, the majority of whom children. A group linked to the Syrian opposition calling itself the "Brigade of Aisha" claimed responsibility for the attack.

See also 
 Allegations of war crimes in the 2006 Lebanon War

References

Neighbourhoods of Beirut
2006 Lebanon War
Shia Muslim communities in Lebanon
Sunni Muslim communities in Lebanon
Maronite Christian communities in Lebanon